Christiansburg Garment Co. v. Equal Employment Opportunity Commission, 434 U.S. 412 (1978), was a case decided by the Supreme Court of the United States that interpreted 42 U.S.C. §1988(b) to generally not require unsuccessful plaintiffs in civil rights cases to pay attorney's fees to the defendant.  There would be an exception, however, for plaintiffs that brought frivolous claims.  This decision has essentially helped create one way fee shifting for plaintiffs in civil rights cases.

References

External links 
 Text of opinion at Justia.com

United States Supreme Court cases
United States civil procedure case law
1978 in United States case law
United States Supreme Court cases of the Burger Court
Equal employment opportunity